Harold King (February 1, 1944 - March 23, 2019) was an American former professional baseball player.

Baseball career
Born in Oviedo, Florida, King attended Oviedo High School and began his professional baseball career in 1962 with the barnstorming Negro league Indianapolis Clowns, and played for the team through 1964.

King was signed as an amateur free agent in 1965 by the California Angels. His hitting performance earned him a late-season promotion to the major leagues.

He made his major league debut at age 23 with the Houston Astros on September 6, 1967 with an eighth-inning, pinch-hit ground out against future Baseball Hall of Fame member Gaylord Perry. His first major league hit came four days later on September 10, 1967 with a single off the Dodgers' Bill Singer. Later in the game he notched both his first triple and first run batted in, also against Singer, driving in Rusty Staub.

King spent the majority of the 1968 season in the minor leagues but, did appear in 27 games with the Astros. On March 11, 1969, he was traded by the Houston Astros to the Boston Red Sox for Mark Schaeffer. King played the  season with the Louisville Colonels of the International League, hitting for a .322 batting average with 9 home runs and 44 runs batted in. He was drafted by the Atlanta Braves on December 1, 1969 in the 1969 Rule 5 draft. His best season in the major leagues was with the 1970 Atlanta Braves. Appearing in 89 games, King had a .260 batting average with 11 home runs and 30 runs batted in.

After two seasons with the Braves, he was sent to the Texas Rangers for Paul Casanova at the Winter Meetings on December 2, 1971. King started the 1972 season in a platoon role alongside right-hand hitting catcher, Dick Billings. He was sent back to the minor leagues in July, after posting only a .180 batting average. On December 1, 1972, the Rangers traded King with Jim Driscoll to the Cincinnati Reds for Jim Merritt.

King became the Reds' third string catcher, playing behind starter and future Baseball Hall of Famer Johnny Bench, and second stringer Bill Plummer. On July 1, 1973, while the Reds trailed their National League Western Division rivals the Los Angeles Dodgers by 11 games in the standings, King hit a ninth inning, pinch-hit, walk-off home run against Don Sutton. King's home run was cited by Reds' manager Sparky Anderson, as a turning point in the season. Starting with the win on King's home run, the Reds gained momentum and went on to post a 60–26 record for the remainder of the season to overtake the Dodgers and win the division championship. King hit three pinch-hit home runs to either tie or win games for the Reds that season. In the only postseason appearance of his career, King had one hit in three at bats as the Reds lost to the New York Mets in the 1973 National League Championship Series. King played his final major league game on October 1, 1974 at the age of 30.

King then had several successful years playing in the Mexican League from 1975 to 1979. As a designated hitter for the Saltillo Saraperos in 1979, he hit 19 home runs and led the league with 124 walks.

Career statistics
In a seven-year major league career, King played in 322 games, accumulating 146 hits in 683 at bats for a .214 career batting average along with 24 home runs, 82 runs batted in and an on-base percentage of .325. He had a .982 career fielding percentage in 204 games as a catcher.

Later life
As of 1986-87, King was the president of the athletic boosters club of Oviedo High School and had a son in the school system. He still lives in Oviedo, where he has a power washing and home maintenance business.

References

External links
Baseball Reference major league statistics
Baseball Reference minor league statistics
Retrosheet profile
Venezuelan Professional Baseball League statistics

1944 births
Living people
African-American baseball players
Águilas del Zulia players
Asheville Tourists players
Atlanta Braves players
Baseball players from Florida
Cincinnati Reds players
Dallas–Fort Worth Spurs players
Denver Bears players
El Paso Sun Kings players
Houston Astros players
Indianapolis Clowns players
Indianapolis Indians players
Louisville Colonels (minor league) players
Major League Baseball catchers
Navegantes del Magallanes players
American expatriate baseball players in Venezuela
Oklahoma City 89ers players
People from Oviedo, Florida
Quad Cities Angels players
Sportspeople from Seminole County, Florida
Texas Rangers players
21st-century African-American people